Millie Marion Peterson (June 11, 1944 – March 30, 2020) was an American politician who served in the Utah State Senate from the 12th district from 1991 to 2003.

She died on March 30, 2020, in Salt Lake City, Utah at age 75.

References

1944 births
2020 deaths
Democratic Party Utah state senators